Yusuf Akbulut (born 19 March 1990) is a Turkish professional footballer who plays as a forward for Kozanspor.

Professional career
Yusuf rejoined his childhood club Kardemir Karabükspor on 17 January 2018. He  made his professional debut at the age of 27 with Kardemir Karabükspor, in a 2-0 Süper Lig loss to Gençlerbirliği S.K. on 20 January 2018.

References

External links
 
 
 
 Kardemir Karabukspor Profile

1990 births
Living people
People from Karabük
Turkish footballers
Kardemir Karabükspor footballers
Batman Petrolspor footballers
24 Erzincanspor footballers
Hatayspor footballers
Siirtspor footballers
Süper Lig players
TFF First League players
TFF Second League players
Association football forwards